E-470 is a  controlled-access toll road that traverses the eastern portion of the Denver metropolitan area in the US state of Colorado. It is the eastern half of the 470 beltway that serves Meridian, Parker, Aurora, Denver International Airport, and Brighton. 

The toll road is neither a state highway nor an Interstate Highway but is instead owned and maintained by the E-470 Public Highway Authority, which is controlled by a governing board of eight elected officials of eight local governments. Construction and operation involves no state or federal funding or taxes, with the exception of a $10 fee originally charged on vehicle registrations for residents of Arapahoe, Adams, and Douglas counties. Historically, 86±2% of the road's revenues have come from tolls.

Route description

E-470 provides an alternate north–south route to Interstate 25 (I-25) for travelers wishing to bypass the eastern side of the Denver metropolitan area. The tollway begins at the I-25/State Highway 470 (SH 470, C-470) interchange in Lone Tree and runs east through an unincorporated community of Meridian and south of the Centennial Airport. It then passes through the north side of Parker, interchanging with SH 83 (Parker Road) before continuing east to Southlands, an outdoor mall in southeast Aurora. It then turns north through Aurora, passing east of Buckley Space Force Base before interchanging with I-70, forming a fly-by interchange. The highway continues north, passing west of Denver International Airport and interchanging with Peña Boulevard at a full cloverleaf interchange to provide travelers access to the airport from the tollway. E-470 then continues north and then turns to the west, entering the outskirts of Brighton and interchanging with I-76 and then U.S. Highway 85 (US 85) near the unincorporated community of Henderson before reaching the northern end at the interchange with I-25, where the toll road continues west as Northwest Parkway north of Thornton.

The quasi-government entity that manages the highway, the E-470 Public Highway Authority, consists of eight member jurisdictions: Adams, Arapahoe, and Douglas counties and the cities of Aurora, Brighton, Commerce City, and Thornton and the town of Parker. In addition to all of these jurisdictions, E-470 also passes through the city and county of Denver near Denver International Airport. Affiliate, nonvoting members of the Authority, which the highway does not directly serve, are the cities of Arvada, Lone Tree, and Greeley; Weld County; and the city and county of Broomfield. Ex officio members are the Colorado Department of Transportation (CDOT), the Denver Regional Council of Governments (DRCOG), the Regional Air Quality Council, and the Regional Transportation District (RTD). The authority is headquartered in Aurora.

Tolls
In addition to 17 ramp toll interchanges, there are five mainline toll stations along the  route and the non-discounted passenger car toll to pass each mainline station is either $4.15 or $4.50; the discounted rates are $2.70 or $2.95. Drivers with ExpressToll accounts, E-470's automated toll collection service, and transponders mounted on their vehicle save 20 percent on posted toll rates along E-470. The toll stations no longer accept cash; E-470 was one of the first highways in the US to implement full highway-speed electronic tolling. Regarding License Plate Toll (for vehicles without ExpressToll transponders), cameras at each station photograph the front and rear license plate of each vehicle. A bill is mailed after approximately 30 days to the registered owner of the vehicle in accordance with state law. The License Plate Toll statement must be paid in full by the due date or a second statement with a one-time $5 late fee will be mailed. If payment is still not received, a third statement is sent with no additional fees. If the account remains unpaid for more than 90 days, the account becomes delinquent and all overdue toll transactions will be sent to a collections law firm for up to four months in an attempt to find the customer and collect payment. The unpaid tolls, the $5 late fee, and a one-time $20 collection fee are due at this time. If payment is still not received, a Civil Penalty Assessment Notice will be mailed for the unpaid tolls, the $5 late fee, the $20 collection fee, and a $25 Civil Penalty per notice. Upon receipt of this document, the customer may request a hearing. If the full payment of the Civil Assessment Notice has not been received in 30 days, a Hearing Officer's Final Notice is issued to include the unpaid tolls, the $5 late fee, the $20 collection fee, the $25 Civil Penalty, and a $20 Court Fee, totaling a maximum of $70 of fees and penalties for each unpaid set of tolls. 

Rental car companies at Denver International Airport have been accused of overcharging unwitting visitors for unpaid tolls because of the road's cashless collection system.

History
E-470 is the eastern portion of what was originally planned as Interstate 470 (I-470), a full outer beltway for the Denver metropolitan area proposed by CDOT in the 1960s. After the completion of SH 470, plans for the eastern extension gained momentum in the 1980s, as Denver moved forward with plans for a new international airport in its corridor. Recognizing the highway's development potential, a number of local governments joined together to create the E-470 Public Highway Authority, a quasi-governmental entity that would construct the highway. In 1987, the Public Highway Authority Law was passed by the Colorado State Legislature, giving the E-470 Public Highway Authority the power to do everything needed to plan, design, finance, construct, and operate the toll highway. The highway would be financed through tolls, a relative rarity in the western US.

The first section, between I-25 in the south and Parker Road in Douglas County, opened to traffic June 1, 1991. Tolling began on July 15, making E-470 the first highway in the US to implement open road electronic tolling. The highway was opened segment by segment until the final stretch connecting to I-25 in the north in Adams County opened on January 3, 2003.

In its early years, traffic was light as the completed portion was short and traversed a largely undeveloped area. With the opening of Denver International Airport in 1995, E-470 came in as a direct route to the airport from the rapidly growing southern tier of the metropolitan area. Upon its completion, the highway provided the same access for northern Colorado, itself a high-growth area. However, perhaps the most significant growth in the region will occur in the E-470 corridor itself, which spawned numerous annexations by member cities; Commerce City has doubled in land area in anticipation of this new development. In the coming decades, 250,000 new residents are expected along the E-470 corridor in Aurora alone, which would nearly double that city's population.

Up until 2006, E-470 had four signalized intersections with I-70 and its outer roads, which often got congested at peak hours. In 2006, the E-470 mainline was relocated about one-quarter mile to the west to bypass the traffic signals and provide free-flowing conditions for toll customers. Ramp traffic accessing I-70 continues to use the signalized interchange, except for northbound E-470 to westbound I-70 traffic, which uses a flyover ramp. The I-70/E-470 Fly-By Interchange Complex in Aurora was recognized by the Design Build Institute of America (DBIA) with a National Design Build Award in 2008.

In November 2014, an additional interchange opened at Quebec Street in Thornton.

In April 2016, E-470 started construction work to widen an  stretch of the toll road to three lanes in each direction between Parker Road and Quincy Avenue in southeastern Aurora. The $90-million (equivalent to $ in ) project was completed December 2017. According to the 2015 E-470 Annual Report (page 3), "The widening is being constructed now to get ahead of the curve on future traffic volume, which has had double-digit growth in each of the past three years."

Exit list

See also

References

External links

 Official Website
 Federal Highway Administration Case Study
 Denver's 470 Saga

Toll roads in Colorado
470 E
Transportation in Aurora, Colorado
Transportation in Denver
Freeways in the United States
Transportation in Douglas County, Colorado
Transportation in Arapahoe County, Colorado
Transportation in Adams County, Colorado
1991 establishments in Colorado
Beltways in the United States